Bétou Airport  is an airport within the town of Bétou in the Likouala Department, Republic of the Congo. The runway also serves as part of the road leading westward out of town.

Bétou is on the Ubangi River, the border with the Democratic Republic of the Congo. East approach and departure will cross the river into the DRC.

See also

 List of airports in the Republic of the Congo
 Transport in the Republic of the Congo

References

External links
OpenStreetMap - Bétou
Bing Maps - Bétou
OurAirports - Bétou

Airports in the Republic of the Congo